Günter Krüger may refer to:

 Günter Krüger (canoeist), West German sprint canoer
 Günter Krüger (judoka) (born 1953), German judoka